The 1992-93 French Rugby Union Championship was won by Castres who beat Grenoble 14-11 in the final, in a match decided by an irregular try accorded by the referee.

It was the third bouclier de Brennus for the Castres Olympique, the first after 43 year

Formula
The championship, called "Group A" was contested by 32 clubs divided in four pools.

At the end of the first phase, the teams classified in the first four of each pool were qualified to play a "Top 16" divided in four pools of four teams.

The eight teams ranked first and second of each pool were admitted to knockout stages

At the end of the season, four club were relegated to the second division: Chalon, l'US Tyrosse, Cognac and Le Creusot.

They were replaced by Périgueux, Dijon,  Lyon OU and Lourdes.

Participants 
The teams are linked according to the ranking,  in bold'' the ones qualified for "Top 16"

 Top 16 
In bold''' the clubs qualified for the next round . All the qualified came from pool 1 and 2 of the first phase.

Knock Out stage

Quarterfinals

Semifinals

Final 

A try of Olivier Brouzet is denied to Grenoble
and the decisive try by Gary Whetton was awarded by the referee, Daniel Salles, when in fact the defender Hueber from Grenoble touched down the ball first in his try zone. This error gave the title to Castres. Salles admitted the error 13 years later
.
.

Notes

References

Bibliography

External links 
 Compte rendu de la finale 1993 sur www.lnr.fr

1993
France
Championship